Shane O'Neill (born 3 January 1990) is an Australian professional skateboarder from Melbourne, Victoria. Shane is a member of the SLS "9 Club" meaning he has landed a trick in the Street League competition that judges scored an average of 9 or better. Shane's trick was a switchstance Switch 360 double kickflip. In 2016 Shane won a silver medal at the X Games in Oslo. His normal stance is Goofy.

In 2021, O'Neill qualified for the 2020 Tokyo Summer Olympics in the street skateboarding competition. He competed in the men's street event at the 2020 Tokyo Olympics. He was ranked sixteenth in the Preliminary Heats and therefore did not compete in the finals. Full details are in Australia at the 2020 Summer Olympics.

Sponsors 

Shane O'Neill has been sponsored since the age of 14. He is sponsored by Nike SB, Thunder Trucks, Villager, Diamond Supply & Co. and Spitfire Wheels. O'Neill was previously sponsored by Primitive Skateboarding, and Skate Mental.

April Skateboards 
On 8 June 2018, O'Neill announced via his Instagram that he would be leaving Primitive to start his own skateboard company. On 5 May 2019, O'Neill announced via Instagram that his new company was called April Skateboards.

As of 2022, the team consists of Shane O'Neill, Guy Mariano, Yuto Horigome, Ish Cepeda and Rayssa Leal.

Notable tricks 
In Shane's 2015 "Shane Goes Skate Mental" video part, Shane performed a nollie backside heelflip down the steps at Wallenberg. This is one of the most difficult tricks a skateboarder has done at this location.

References

External links
 

1990 births
Living people
Australian skateboarders
Australian company founders
Olympic skateboarders of Australia
Skateboarders at the 2020 Summer Olympics
Sportspeople from Melbourne